Xianan Township is a township in Huanjiang Maonan Autonomous County, Guangxi, China.

Administrative division
As of 2021, the township is divided into one community and ten villages: 
Xianan Community
Bochuan
Yifeng
Zhongnan
Guzhou
Tangba
Yuhuan
Xiyuan
Jingyang
Xiatang
Caimen

History
During the Qing dynasty (1644–1911), it belonged to Si'en County.

In 1933 during the Republic of China, Xianan Township was set up.

In 1950, it came under the jurisdiction of the Fourth District. In 1955, its name was changed to Xianan District. It was renamed Heping People's Commune in 1958 and Xianan People's Commune in 1959. In 1984, Xianan Township was renamed "Xianan Maonan Ethnic Township". In 1987, it reverted to its former name of Xianan Township.

Geography
The township lies at the southwestern of Huanjiang Maonan Autonomous County, bordering Nandan County to the west, Jinchengjiang District to the south, Chuanshan Town to the north, and Shuiyuan Town to the east.

The Dagou River flows through the township north to south.

Economy
The township's economy is based on nearby mineral resources and agricultural resources. The main crops are rice, corn, soybean and sweet potato. Sugarcane is one of the important economic crops in the region. The region abounds with calcite, marble, clay, talc, and hematite.

Demographics

The 2019 census showed the township's population to be 18,661, an decrease of -1.8% from the 2011 census.

References

Bibliography

 

Divisions of Huanjiang Maonan Autonomous County